In mathematics, a proof without words (or visual proof) is an illustration of an identity or mathematical statement which can be demonstrated as self-evident by a diagram without any accompanying explanatory text. Such proofs can be considered more elegant than formal or mathematically rigorous proofs due to their self-evident nature. When the diagram demonstrates a particular case of a general statement, to be a proof, it must be generalisable.

A proof without words is not the same as a mathematical proof, because it omits the details of the logical argument it illustrates. However, it can provide valuable intuitions to the viewer that can help them formulate or better understand a true proof.

Examples

Sum of odd numbers

The statement that the sum of all positive odd numbers up to 2n − 1 is a perfect square—more specifically, the perfect square n2—can be demonstrated by a proof without words.

In one corner of a grid, a single block represents 1, the first square. That can be wrapped on two sides by a strip of three blocks (the next odd number) to make a 2 × 2 block: 4, the second square. Adding a further five blocks makes a 3 × 3 block: 9, the third square. This process can be continued indefinitely.

Pythagorean theorem

The Pythagorean theorem that  can be proven without words.

Jensen's inequality

Jensen's inequality can also be proven graphically. A dashed curve along the X axis is the hypothetical distribution of X, while a dashed curve along the Y axis is the corresponding distribution of Y values. The convex mapping Y(X) increasingly "stretches" the distribution for increasing values of X.

Usage
Mathematics Magazine and the College Mathematics Journal run a regular feature titled "Proof without words" containing, as the title suggests, proofs without words. The Art of Problem Solving and USAMTS websites run Java applets illustrating proofs without words.

Compared to formal proofs
For a proof to be accepted by the mathematical community, it must logically show how the statement it aims to prove follows totally and inevitably from a set of assumptions. A proof without words might imply such an argument, but it does not make one directly, so it cannot take the place of a formal proof where one is required. Rather, mathematicians use proofs without words as illustrations and teaching aids for ideas that have already been proven formally.

See also

Notes

References

.

 
Articles containing proofs
Mathematical proofs